Herbert James Carter (23 April 1858 – 16 April 1940) was an English-born Australian schoolmaster and entomologist.


Early life
Carter was born at Marlborough, Wiltshire, England, the son of James Carter, farmer, and his wife Mary Ann, née Freeman. He was educated at Aldenham school, Hertfordshire, and at Jesus College, Cambridge, where he graduated B.A. in 1881. He was also a keen cricketer.

Career
Migrating to Australia (arriving on the Potosi  on 19 February 1882) Carter was made assistant mathematics master at Sydney Grammar School, later becoming senior mathematics master. In 1902 he became principal of Ascham girls' school until 1914. During World War I, Carter became a founding member of the executive committee of the Australian branch of the British Red Cross Society.

Carter became interested in the study of the Coleoptera (beetles and weevils), he joined the Linnean Society of New South Wales and was a member of its council from 1920 to 1939, and its president in 1925–1926. He was joint editor of The Australian Encyclopaedia which was published in 1925–1926. He was able to obtain the help of the leading scientists of Australia, and their articles formed a large and valuable part of this publication. In his own work Carter gave much attention to matters of synonymy, and published a number of check-lists of the families. He died suddenly at his home at Wahroonga, Sydney, on 16 April 1940.

Legacy
Around fifty of his papers are listed in Musgrave's Bibliography of Australian Entomology 1775-1930, and Carter continued working almost up to the day of his death. He married Antoinette Charlotte Moore in 1882, who pre-deceased him, and was survived by two sons and two daughters. Carter was much esteemed by his scientific colleagues. Many of them are mentioned in his Gulliver in the Bush (1933), a record of his collecting trips in Australia. He was honorary entomologist to the Australian Museum, Sydney, for some years. He disposed of one collection of Coleoptera to the National Museum, Melbourne, and a later collection was given to the Council for Scientific and Industrial Research at Canberra. One of Carter's sons Lieut.-Colonel Herbert Gordon Carter, D.S.O., (1885–1963), fought in World War I.

References

G. T. Franki, 'Carter, Herbert James (1858 - 1940)', Australian Dictionary of Biography, Volume 7, MUP, 1979, pp 584–585.

1858 births
1940 deaths
People from Marlborough, Wiltshire
Australian entomologists
Australian people of English descent
Alumni of Jesus College, Cambridge